Markus Ljungh (born 11 January 1991) is a Swedish professional ice hockey player. He is currently playing with Linköping HC of the Swedish Hockey League (SHL).

Ljungh signed on for Djurgården in May 2012 and also extended the contract for an additional two years in September 2014. He previously played for Västerås IK in the HockeyAllsvenskan. In 2011 Ljungh was awarded 'Guldgallret' as the best junior player in HockeyAllsvenskan. In 2018, Ljungh signed with HV71.

References

External links

1991 births
Admiral Vladivostok players
Djurgårdens IF Hockey players
HV71 players
Linköping HC players
Living people
Swedish ice hockey centres
VIK Västerås HK players
Sportspeople from Västerås